BPATC School and College, also known as BPATCSC is an educational institution in Bangladesh established in 1984 as primary school. In 1988 it became secondary school. In 2000 it started a college section.

It is in Bangladesh Public Administration Training Centre (BPATC), Savar, Dhaka.

Governing Body
BPATC School and college is administered by the rules and regulations of Higher secondary education board Bangladesh. It is continuously governed by the prominent Governing Body formed by Bangladesh Public Administration Training Centre (BPATC). The honorable Rector of BPATC, (Savar, Dhaka) performs the duty of the chairman of the Governing Body. The chairman, the vice-chairman and the members concerned of the GB constitute the principles of conducting the institution and the college is also run according to that principles. The principal is the administrative Head of the college. According to the decisions of the GB the principal governs the academic as well as administrative activities. * The tenure of the Governing Body remains valid for 3years from the first meeting of the GB.

Governing Body
Chairman : Ramendra Nath Biswas, Rector (Secretary to the Government), Bangladesh Public Administration Training Centre, Savar, Dhaka.
Member : Mohammad Razibul Islam, Director (Admin), Bangladesh Public Administration Training Centre, Savar, Dhaka.
Member : Md. Siddiqur Rahman, Director (Administration), Bangladesh Public Administration Training Centre, Savar, Dhaka.
Member : Fatema Begum, Guardian Representative, BPATC School & College, Savar, Dhaka.
Member : Shikder Moniruzzaman (Senio Lecturer, English), BPATC School & College, Savar, Dhaka.
Member : Mukita Khatun (Senior Teacher), BPATC School & College, Savar, Dhaka.
Member Secretary of The Governing Body : S M Mehedi Hasan, Director and Principal (In-Charge), BPATC School & College, Savar, Dhaka.

Alumni Association
Ex-students of BPATC School and College founded BPATC School and College Alumni Association.

See also 
 Savar Cantonment Public School and College
 Radio Colony Model School and College
 Jahangirnagar University School & College
 Morning Glory School and College

References
 official website of bpatcsc
 official website of bpatcsc alumni association

Schools in Dhaka District
Colleges in Dhaka District